Troy Greenidge (born 30 August 1992) is a St Lucian association footballer who currently plays for Northern United All Stars in the Saint Lucia Gold Division, and the St Lucia national football team.

Career
Greenidge made his debut for the St Lucia national football team in 2013 against Grenada. His first goal would come during the islands first leg match of the 2018 FIFA World Cup qualification – CONCACAF Second Round against Antigua and Barbuda in a convincing 3-1 win. He has also represented the Saint Lucia national under-17 football team.

International Goals
Scores and results list St Lucia's  goal tally first.

References

External links
 
 

1992 births
Living people
Saint Lucian footballers
Saint Lucia international footballers
Association football forwards